Lara may refer to:

Places 
 Lara (state), a state in Venezuela
Electoral district of Lara, an electoral district in Victoria, Australia
 Lara, Antalya, an urban district in Turkey
 Lara, Victoria, a township in Australia
 Lara de los Infantes, a place in Spain
 LARA, the airport code for Jacinto Lara International Airport, in Barquisimeto, Venezuela

Personal name 
 Lara (mythology), a naiad nymph, daughter of the river Almo in Ovid's Fasti
 Lara (name), can be a given name or a surname in several languages

Art, entertainment, and media
 Lara (film), 2019 film
 Lara (character), the biological mother of the comic book character Superman
 Lara (novel), 1997 novel-in-verse by Bernardine Evaristo
 Lara & Reyes, an instrumental band
 Lara's Theme, the generic name given to a leitmotif written for the film Doctor Zhivago (1965) by composer Maurice Jarre
 Lara, A Tale (1814), a poem by Lord Byron

Computing and technology
 LaRa, a spacecraft instrument on board the ExoMars 2020 platform

Natural science
 Lara (genus), a genus of beetles
 Lara, a cultivar of walnut

Sport
 Brian Lara, former West Indian cricket player
 Cardenales de Lara, a professional baseball club in Venezuela
 Unión Lara, a professional soccer club in Venezuela

“LARA” este un serial din România,În “LARA” este un pelerinaj numit Lara cu magie suspans amintiri serial 13+,3 sezoane,pe Netflix sunt doar 2.

See also 
 Lar (disambiguation)

 Laraha
 Lora (disambiguation)